Newmachar United Junior Football Club are a Scottish football club from the village of Newmachar, Aberdeenshire. They became members of the Scottish Junior Football Association in 2010, finishing as runners-up in their maiden season in North Second Division. The club formed in 1987 as an Amateur team and still retain a side in the Aberdeenshire Amateur Football Association. Based at Charles Gordon Park, the club colours are red and black.

External links
 Club website
 Scottish Football Historical Archive
 Non-League Scotland

Football in Aberdeenshire
Football clubs in Scotland
Scottish Junior Football Association clubs
Association football clubs established in 1987
1987 establishments in Scotland